Ahmet Bilek (15 March 1932 in Kula, Manisa, Turkey – 4 October 1970 in Saarbrücken, Germany) was a Turkish Olympic champion sports wrestler in the flyweight class (52 kg) and a trainer. He won the gold medal in men's freestyle wrestling at the 1960 Olympics.

He was born in 1932 in the western Turkish town of Kula in Manisa Province.

After his successful participation at the Olympics in Rome, Ahmet Bilek emigrated to Germany following his teammates Mithat Bayrak and Müzahir Sille. He continued his sports career in the wrestling club KSV Köllerbach in Püttlingen, a small town near Saarbrücken and became German champion in 1966 and 1968.

Ahmet Bilek committed suicide in 1970 in Germany.

He was married to Ayten and had a son Ali and a daughter Sevil.

Achievements
 1953 World Wrestling Championships in Naples, Italy - silver (Greco-Roman Flyweight)
 1955 Mediterranean Games in Barcelona, Spain - gold (Greco-Roman Flyweight)
 1959 World Wrestling Championships in Tehran, Iran - silver (Freestyle Flyweight)
 1960 Balkan Wrestling Championships in Burgas, Bulgaria - silver (Freestyle Flyweight)
 1960 Summer Olympics in Rome, Italy - gold (Freestyle Flyweight)

References

External links
 

1932 births
1970 suicides
Sportspeople from Manisa
Wrestlers at the 1960 Summer Olympics
Turkish male sport wrestlers
Olympic gold medalists for Turkey
Suicides in Germany
Olympic medalists in wrestling
Medalists at the 1960 Summer Olympics
Mediterranean Games gold medalists for Turkey
Wrestlers at the 1955 Mediterranean Games
Mediterranean Games medalists in wrestling
20th-century Turkish people